W krainie Gryfitów is an anthology of  tales, legends and fairy tales connected with the history of  Western Pomerania edited by Stanisław Świrko and illustrated by Wiesław Majchrzak. It was published for the first time in 1976.

Despite its primarily commercial character, W krainie Gryfitów is a tome useful both to the Polish folklorists, as a basis for a more scientific research into the folklore of the western part of Poland, as well as an attempt to find the Western Pomerania's Slavic roots, due to the constant disconnection and reconnection of this geographic area from the lands of Poland, since the first union of Polish tribes into one Polish nation under the Mieszko I's of Poland rule.

The anthology is filled with short stories and myths about various figures from the folks beliefs, such as Slavic deities, sirens, rusalkas, vodyanoys, spectres, vampires, strzygas and various types of animals. Some stories are also about transforming humans into animals or inanimate objects.

Contents 
The anthology begins with a Preface written by Stanisław Świrko. The rest of the tome consists of ten chapters of thematically arranged works:

I. W WALCE O ZIEMIĘ OJCZYSTĄ (Fighting for the Motherland)
 Marzenna Rzeszowska – O zakopanym dzwonie i dzielnych rycerzach księcia Bogusława I
 Tymoteusz Karpowicz – O bartniku Cichu i walczącym niedźwiedziu 
 Czesław Piskorski i Ryszarda Wilczyńska – O włóczniach Mohortowych rycerzy
 Marzenna Rzeszowska – O obrońcach Góry Zamkowej 
 Stefan Deskur – Rak 
 Marzenna Rzeszowska – O żołnierzach zamienionych w drzewa 
 Marzenna Rzeszowska – O śpiących rycerzach znad Odry 
 Czesław Piskorski – Jak rycerz Bartłomiej z Dębogóry wypędził Brandenburczyków z Gardźca 
 Stanisław Świrko – O słowiańskiej osadzie Parsęcko i Krzywym Marcinie 

II. O WŁADCACH POMORZA ZACHODNIEGO (Of the Western Pomerania's rulers)
 Czesław Piskorski i Stanisław Świrko – Jak powstały Mieszkowice 
 Czesław Piskorski – O Żelisławie i gnieździe gryfów 
 Marzenna Rzeszowska – O księciu Barnimie II i pięknej żonie rycerza Widanty 
 Marceli Labon – O księżnie Zofii i Janie z Maszewa 
 Marzenna Rzeszowska – O błaźnie Mikołaju 
 Marzenna Rzeszowska – O Sydonii, Białej Damie szczecińskiego zamku 
 Marzenna Rzeszowska – Ostatni z rodu olbrzymów 
 Marzenna Rzeszowska – O białym orle nad cmentarzem olbrzymów 
 Marzenna Rzeszowska – Śmierć księcia 
 Stanisław Świrko – Dąb Trzech Panów 
 Tymoteusz Karpowicz – Świadectwo hańby 

III. O DAWNYCH PANACH I PODDANYCH (Of the ancient Sirs and their subjects)
 Marzenna Rzeszowska – Noc sylwestrowa nad Słupią 
 Czesław Piskorski – O rycerzach i okrutnym feudale 
 Władysław Łęga – Księżniczka bez serca 
 Marzenna Rzeszowska – Widma 
 Gracjan Bojar-Fijałkowski – Upiór w Suchej 
 Stanisław Pawłowicz – O trzech dębach z Osowa 
 Janina Buczyńska – Przeklęty zamek na Wzgórzu Wisielców 
 Janina Buczyńska – O okrutnym władcy zbójeckiego zamku 
 Roman Zmorski – Dobry starosta 

IV. O DAWNYCH BOGACH I BOŻKACH POGAŃSKICH TUDZIEŻ O KOŚCIOŁACH, KLASZTORACH I ZAKONNIKACH (Of the old pagan gods and idols, or else of the churches, monasteries and monks)
 Władysław Łęga – Ofiara 
 Władysław Łęga – Koń wróżbita 
 Gracjan Bojar-Fijałkowski – Klęska Belbuka 
 Bolesław Kibała – O pogańskich dziewicach nad Drawą 
 Gracjan Bojar-Fijałkowski – Wróżba Swantewita 
 Stefan Deskur – Boży Dar 
 Monika Wiśniewska – Zjawy topielców koło Jęczydołu 
 Stanisław Świrko – O lubińskiej syrenie i zakonniku 
 Janina Buczyńska – O swobnickim komturze i urodziwej córce wójtowej
 Stefan Deskur – Płomień 
 Gracjan Bojar-Fijałkowski – Płaczące dzwony 
 Czesław Piskorski – O diable z Kniei Bukowej 
 Gracjan Bojar-Fijałkowski – Opat Bruno z Kołbacza 
 Gracjan Bojar-Fijałkowski – Jesiotry braciszka Urbana 
 Stanisław Pawłowicz – O kościele Mariackim w Stargardzie 
 Jerzy Buczyński – O słowiańskiej bogini śmierci 
 Ryszarda Wilczyńska – O dzwonach z goleniowskiej fary 

V. O MORZU, JEZIORACH, RZEKACH I DZIELNYCH RYBAKACH (Of the sea, lakes, rivers and brave fishermen)
 Władysław Łęga – Król głębin 
 Marzenna Rzeszowska – O rusałce z Nowogardna 
 Marzenna Rzeszowska – O regalickim wodniku 
 Stanisław Rzeszowski – O pięciogłowym smoku 
 Tymoteusz Karpowicz – O dąbskiej syrenie 
 Tymoteusz Karpowicz – O rybaku i diable 
 Jerzy Buczyński – O rzece Inie 
 Gracjan Bojar-Fijałkowski – Diabeł powsinoga 
 Marzenna Rzeszowska – O złośliwym diable i sprytnym rybaku 
 Janina Sidorowicz – O rycerzu Warszu i Warszewskim Jeziorze 
 Stanisław Świrko – Syrena z Trzęsacza 

VI. O MIŁOŚCI RYCERSKIEJ I WIEŚNIACZEJ  (Of the knights' love and peasants' love)
 Gracjan Bojar-Fijałkowski – Pieśń Świętobora 
 Gracjan Bojar-Fijałkowski – O zaczarowanej księżniczce Sygrydzie 
 Tymoteusz Karpowicz – Siedem wierzb 
 Gracjan Bojar-Fijałkowski – O dwóch braciach rycerzach i ich niesławnej śmierci 
 Stefan Deskur – Bliźniaki 
 Janina Buczyńska – O kupcównie Małgosi i szadzkim kasztelanie 
 Marzenna Rzeszowska – O kochankach z Trzęsacza 
 Marzenna Rzeszowska – O niezgodnych rycerzach 
 Stanisław Świrko – O szewczyku i pięknej starościance 

VII. O GRODACH POMORSKICH I ICH MIESZKAŃCACH (Of Pomeranian Gords and their inhabitants)
 Stanisław Świrko – O zatopionej Winecie 
 Jerzy Buczyński – Ślepy rumak z Winety 
 Marzenna Rzeszowska – O zdrajcy burmistrzu i pasterce Anusi 
 Marzenna Rzeszowska – Tajemnica herbu Goleniowa 
 Czesław Piskorski – Wieniec Zgody 
 Gracjan Bojar-Fijałkowski – Zaraza w Połczynie 
 Stanisław Świrko – Kłopoty mieszkańców Sianowa 
 Jerzy Buczyński i Stanisław Świrko – Skąd pochodzi nazwa miasta Kamień 
 Jerzy Buczyński – O Morzu Czerwonym w Stargardzie 
 Jerzy Buczyński – Baszta Kaszana w Trzebiatowie 
 Stanisław Świrko – Skarby zamku drahimskiego 
 Stanisław Świrko – Ambona w Radaczu 
 Marceli Labon – O widmie na Grodźcu 

VIII. O ZBÓJCACH I PIRATACH (Of robbers and pirates)
 Gracjan Bojar-Fijałkowski – O zbójcach z Góry Chełmskiej i mosiężnym rogu 
 Monika Wiśniewska – O głazie Kołyską zwanym 
 Stanisław Deskur – Rozbójnik 
 Gracjan Bojar-Fijałkowski – Strachy nad jeziorem Glicko 
 Tymoteusz Karpowicz – Czarny Lewiatan 
 Władysław Łęga – Okręt widmo 
 Tymoteusz Karpowicz – Siedmiu łebian w niebie 
 Stanisław Świrko – O urodziwej Stence * korsarce wolińskiej 

IX. O ZACZAROWANYCH SKARBACH, SZCZĘŚCIU I LUDZKIEJ CHCIWOŚCI (Of the enchanted riches, happiness and human greed)
 Gracjan Bojar-Fijałkowski – O ubogim gospodarzu i bursztynowych skarbach 
 Janina Buczyńska – Ubogi bednarz z Kołbacza, który osadę Sowno założył 
 Gracjan Bojar-Fijałkowski – Kamień szczęścia 
 Gracjan Bojar-Fijałkowski – Skarby podziemnego zamku 
 Stanisław Rzeszowski – Skarb rycerza o sześciu palcach 
 Stanisław Rzeszowski – O skamieniałym chciwcu z Karska 
 Marzenna Rzeszowska – O strażnikach skarbu i pracowitym szewczyku 
 Władysław Łęga – Dzwon 
 Tymoteusz Karpowicz – Złote Jezioro 
 Tymoteusz Karpowicz – Ślepiec z Łeknicy 
 Stanisław Świrko – Szczęście na moście 
 Marzenna Rzeszowska – O skarbie i szubienicy na Serbskiej Górze 

X. BAŚNIE O KARZEŁKACH, DIABŁACH, CZAROWNICACH I STRACHACH (Fairy tales about midgets, devils, witches and things that go bump in the night)
 Gracjan Bojar-Fijałkowski – O dobrych karzełkach znad brzegów Jamna 
 Władysław Łęga – Niezwykłe wesele 
 Gracjan Bojar-Fijałkowski – O dwóch białych gołąbkach 
 Gracjan Bojar-Fijałkowski – Lestek na królewskim dworze 
 Gracjan Bojar-Fijałkowski – Tajemnica czarnej wody 
 Gracjan Bojar-Fijałkowski – Nocna przygoda drwala Marcina 
 Gracjan Bojar-Fijałkowski – Śpiewający przetak 
 Gracjan Bojar-Fijałkowski – O dwóch siostrach gęsiareczkach 
 Gracjan Bojar-Fijałkowski – Odmieniec 
 Gracjan Bojar-Fijałkowski – Pas wilkołaka 
 Gracjan Bojar-Fijałkowski – Kamienna chatka 
 Gracjan Bojar-Fijałkowski – Jak rycerz Bonin diabłu duszę zaprzedał 
 Stefan Deskur – Sześć sióstr 
 Gracjan Bojar-Fijałkowski – Człowiek w kamień zaklęty
 Gracjan Bojar-Fijałkowski – Olbrzym, diabeł i przemyślny karzełek 
 Gracjan Bojar-Fijałkowski – O złych wróżkach i cudownym źródełku 
 Monika Wiśniewska – Sabat czarownic na górze Słup 
 Władysław Łęga – O zamku w Sławnie 
 Gracjan Bojar-Fijałkowski – Fałszywa kartka 
 Gracjan Bojar-Fijałkowski – Księga tajemnej wiedzy 
 Stanisław Rzeszowski – O błędnym ogniku 

W krainie Gryfitów ends with Dictionary of old Polish words, Polish dialects, and foreign words and  Sources. The table of contents, found at the very end of the tome, is entitled Spis Rzeczy, which translates roughly as “The list of things”.

References 

Polish folklore